Too Much Heart is a 1992 Spanish thriller drama film directed by Eduardo Campoy from a screenplay by Agustín Díaz Yanes which stars Victoria Abril in a dual role and Manuel Bandera alongside Pastora Vega, Mónica Molina and Manuel Gil.

Plot 
The plot follows two identical twins, Clara and Ana (one being very cold and calculating, contrasting to her very shy and sentimental twin), who move to the province of Cádiz and both fall romantically for a live wire man.

Cast

Production 
The screenplay was penned by Agustín Díaz Yanes. The film is a Cartel, Sogetel, and Flamenco Films production. It was shot in the province of Cádiz from October to November 1991. Shooting locations included the Club Social Las Redes in El Puerto de Santa María.

Release 
The film received a pre-screening in Madrid on 17 September 1992, and was theatrically released on 50 theatres on 18 September 1992.

Reception 
Augusto Martínez Torres of El País deemed the film to be "an attractive melodrama with twins", displaying a "well-constructed" story, consistent characters, as well as good-sounding dialogue, with the director managing to provide the necessary harmony to the whole.

Accolades 

|-
| rowspan = "2" align = "center" | 1993 || rowspan = "2" | 7th Goya Awards || Best Supporting Actress || Pastora Vega ||  || rowspan = "2" | 
|-
| Best Special Effects || Lee Wilson || 
|}

See also 
 List of Spanish films of 1992

References 

Films set in Andalusia
Films shot in the province of Cádiz
1992 thriller films
Spanish thriller drama films
1990s Spanish-language films
1990s Spanish films